The Diocese of Espoo (Finnish Espoon hiippakunta) is the newest of the nine dioceses of the Evangelical Lutheran Church of Finland. The diocese came into existence in 2004 after the Diocese of Helsinki was split in two. 

The seat of the diocese is the Espoo Cathedral and its first bishop was Mikko Heikka. 

After Heikka's successor Tapio Luoma was elected Archbishop in 2018, Kaisamari Hintikka was elected to succeed him in 2019.

List of Bishops
 Mikko Heikka 2004-2011
 Tapio Luoma 2012-2018
 Kaisamari Hintikka 2019-

External links
 Official website 

Christian organizations established in 2004
Dioceses established in the 21st century
Espoo